The 2021 season was the Chicago Bears' 102nd season in the National Football League, their 103rd overall, and their fourth and final under head coach Matt Nagy. This was the first season under the NFL's new 17-game schedule.

The Bears finished 6–11, failing to improve upon their 8–8 record from the previous year, and failed to return to the playoffs. Nagy along with general manager Ryan Pace were fired on January 10, 2022.

Draft

Notes
 The Bears traded their first-round selection (20th overall) and their fifth-round selection (164th overall) as well as their 2022 first and fourth-round selections to the New York Giants in exchange for a first-round selection (11th overall).
The Bears traded their second-round selection (52nd overall), third-round selection (83rd overall) and sixth-round selection (204th overall) to the Carolina Panthers in exchange for a second-round selection (39th overall) and a fifth-round selection (151st overall).
The Bears traded their fourth-round selection to the Minnesota Vikings in exchange for a 2020 fifth-round selection.
 The Bears acquired a conditional seventh-round selection, which could be upgraded to a sixth-rounder, in a trade that sent tight end Adam Shaheen to the Miami Dolphins and the pick ended up becoming a sixth-round selection (208th overall).
 The Bears traded their sixth-round selection (208th overall) to the Seattle Seahawks in exchange for 2020 sixth-round (217th overall) and seventh-round (250th overall) selections.

Staff

Final roster

Preseason

Regular season

Schedule
The Bears' 2021 schedule was announced on May 12.

Game summaries

Week 1: at Los Angeles Rams

Week 2: vs. Cincinnati Bengals

Week 3: at Cleveland Browns

Week 4: vs. Detroit Lions

Week 5: at Las Vegas Raiders

Week 6: vs. Green Bay Packers

Week 7: at Tampa Bay Buccaneers

Week 8: vs. San Francisco 49ers

Week 9: at Pittsburgh Steelers

Week 11: vs. Baltimore Ravens

Week 12: at Detroit Lions
Thanksgiving Day games

Week 13: vs. Arizona Cardinals

Week 14: at Green Bay Packers

Week 15: vs. Minnesota Vikings

Week 16: at Seattle Seahawks

Week 17: vs. New York Giants

Week 18: at Minnesota Vikings

Standings

Division

Conference

References

External links
 

Chicago
Chicago Bears seasons
Chicago Bears